Karamergen is a medieval Kazakh settlement.

History
In the first information about the existence of the ruins of ancient cities on the southern shore of lake Balkhash belong to the end of the XIX century.in the 1960s, under the leadership of  Akishev, K. M. Baypakov and L. B. Yerzakovich, archaeological research was conducted on the settlement.
Karamergen settlement dates back to the IX-XIII century and is identified with the city of Gorguz. One of the routes of the medieval caravan route went to the cities of the southern Balkhash region, in the lower reaches of Ili, along the Ortasu channel (or. Ili), where the remains of the cities of Karamergen, Aktam and Agashayak were found to the shore of Balkhash, and then along the Uzun-Aral Peninsula, which almost connects the southern and Northern shores of the lake, leaving a Strait a little more than 8 km wide.

Description
The settlement is a rectangle (115 x 120 m), oriented at the corners according to the countries of the world. The height of the walls reaches three meters. At the four corners are round, strongly protruding outward towers 4.5 m high. the North-Eastern and South-Western sides have two more round towers 3.5 m high. Entrances to the settlement can be traced in the middle of the North-Western and South-Eastern walls. The structure of their complex. They are flanked by an L-shaped section of the wall, at the corners of which there are two more towers, and the South-Eastern entrance is still strengthened by an outrigger shaft, preserved to a height of 1.5 m. 20 m to the East of the South tower is a trapezoidal structure, surrounded by a half-meter-high rampart. On the South-Eastern side of the settlement, at a distance of 0.8–1 km, there is a main channel, which was taken out of the bed of one of the channels of the now waterless Ortasu river. Pottery from the excavations dates back to the IX-XIII centuries. these are cauldrons, table and water-bearing jugs, mugs, bowls, large vessels for storing water, grain and flour – huma. In addition to irrigated agriculture, hunting in the tugai forests, where Turan tigers were found, as well as fishing in the waters of the Ili river and lake Balkhash, played an important role in the life of the citizens of Karamergen.

Location
Almaty region, Balkhash district, on the Bank of the dry ortasu branch in Shet-Bakanas, on the territory of the saryesik-Atyrau desert, 200 km North-East of the village of Bakanas.

Preservation of the monument
The monument is under state protection, included in the State list of historical and cultural monuments of national significance in 2015. It is included in the UNESCO World Heritage list as part of the Semirechensk section of the serial nomination of monuments of the Great silk road. There is no physical protection of the monument in place.

Sources of information about the monument
 Baypakov K. M., Yerzakovich L. B. Ancient cities of Kazakhstan. Alma-ATA, 1971.
 Baypakov K., Voyakin D. Kazakhstan section of the silk road. Almaty. 2012.

References

World Heritage Sites in Kazakhstan